Burra Parish located at  is a cadastral parish in Kennedy County New South Wales.

Burra Parish is located between Fifield and Tullamore, New South Wales.

References

Parishes of Kennedy County